Emily Sandberg Gold (born May 26, 1978) is an American businesswoman, model, and actress. She was born in Rochester, MN; home of the Mayo Clinic. Gold was the international face of Clinique, Donna Karan, Versace, Fendi, and The Gap. She has also been featured on the covers of Italian Vogue, Japanese Vogue, and Italian Marie Claire.

Following a career in fashion, Gold became the founder and CEO of digital marketing agency Twice Social.

Fashion

From 1999 to 2007, Gold was an international runway fixture, walking for fashion houses like Marc Jacobs. She has been the face of  ad campaigns for Versace, Fendi, DKNY and Marni. She has been photographed by artists including Annie Leibovitz, Steven Meisel, Mario Testino, Craig McDean, Mikael Jansson and Peter Lindbergh. Gold has also appeared on five Vogue covers, as well as the covers of Harper's Bazaar and Elle.

She was named one of the top 50 models by Models.com Marc Jacobs created a bag inspired by and named Emily. Gold has been represented by Next NY, Elite LA, Fashion Milan, Elite Paris 

Gold's former blog, Supermodel Central, chronicled her life as model and featured interview of models and fashion's creative teams.

Vogue named Emily as a runway-star-turned-tech-entrepreneur who returned to the runway for Prada's FW 22 runway show in Milan. The runway show was a "salute to profession of modeling" and a "history of women."

Highlights 
1998
 Face of Armani Collezioni
 Cover for Italian Vogue (November 1998)

1999
Walks the fall Dolce & Gabbana and Jil Sander shows in Milan (February 1999)
Photographed by Steven Meisel for the cover of Italian Vogue (March 1999)
Lands two editorials for Italian Vogue with Peter Lindbergh (March 1999)
Photographed by Steven Meisel for Versace Atelier spring ad campaign
Photographed by Peter Lindbergh for Vogue (September 1999)
Walks the spring Balenciaga, Dries Van Noten, Louis Vuitton, and Yves Saint Laurent shows in Paris (October 1999)
Face of Fendi fall ad campaign

2000
Photographed by Patrick Demarchelier for Harper’s Bazaar (January 2000)
Appears in Gap campaign (March 2000)

2002
Photographed by Steven Meisel for the cover of Italian Vogue (September 2002)
Walks the spring Anna Sui and Marc Jacobs shows in New York (September 2002)
Face of Gap (November 2002)

2006
Appears on cover of Japanese Vogue (June 2006)
Photographed by Laurie Bartley for Italian Flair (October 2006)

2007
Returns to the runway walking the fall Naum show in New York (February 2007)
Photographed by Lucio Gelsi for Italian Flair (March 2007)
Appears in Marie Claire editorial (September 2007)

2008
Appears in Banana Republic campaign (September 2008)

2015
Appears in The Prime Book: Redefining Women in their Prime (Photographer - Peter Freed)
2022

 Walks Prada FW 22 in Milan

Advertising 

 Armani
 Ann Taylor
 Banana Republic
 Barneys New York
 Bloomingdale's
 Calvin Klein
 Cesare Paciottti
 DKNY
 Fendi
 GAP
 Gianfranco Ferre
 H&M
 Indivi
 Krizia
 Les Copains Trend
 Louis Vuitton
 Marni
 Nicole Farhi
 Rosalina
 Ruffo Research
 Sportmax
 Versace Atelier

Covers 

 'Vogue' - November 1998
 "Vogue" September 1998
 'Vogue' - March 1999
 'Vogue' (Supplement) - March 1999
 'Glamour' April
 'Glamour' September 2000
 'D' - September 18, 2001
 'Vogue' - September 2002
 'Vogue beauty' Japan

Runway 

 Ready to wear - Autumn/Winter 1999 {Antonio Pernas, DKNY, Dolce & Galbana, Donna Karan, Dries Van Noten, Jil Sander}
 Ready to wear - Spring/Summer 2000 {Alberta Ferretti, Anna Sui, Anteprima, Antonio Berardi, Badgley Mischka, Balenciaga, Blumarine, Bottega Veneta, Cerruti, Chanel, Costume National, Dolce & Gabbana, Donna Karan, Dries Van Noten, Exté, Genny, Martine Sitbon, Massimo Rebecchi, Max Mara, Michael Kors, Mila Schön, Narciso Rodriguez, New York Industrie, NYC 2000, Sportmax, Ter et Bantine, Thimister, Trend Les Copains, Tuleh, Victor Victoria}
 Ready to wear - Autumn/Winter 2000 {Calvin Klein, John Bartlett, Loewe, Michael Kors, Prada, Victor Alfaro, Vivienne Tam}
 Ready to wear - Spring/Summer 2001 {Christian Dior, Christian Lacroix, Louis Vuitton, Martine Sitbon, Pamela Dennis}
 Ready to wear - Autumn/Winter 2001 {Christian Lacroix, Imitation of Christ}
 Ready to wear - Spring/Summer 2003 {Anna Sui, Dolce & Gabbana, Marc Jacobs, Maurizio Pecoraro, Y's}
 Ready to wear - Autumn/Winter 2003 {Zero Maria Cornejo}
 Ready to wear - Spring/Summer 2022 {Prada}

Acting 
In 2001, Sandberg Gold moved to Los Angeles.  Soon after, she landed her first big-screen role in the independent film Desperate. She made an uncredited appearance in film The Devil Wears Prada and also had a role in film Employee of the Month. Gold appears along with John Travolta and Robin Williams in feature film Old Dogs.

Filmography 
 The Devil Wears Prada (2006) - Clacker (uncredited)
 Desperate Independent film
 Employee of the Month (2006) - Young Mom
 Old Dogs (2009) - Sara

Twice Social 
Sandberg Gold's marketing agency, Twice Social, is responsible for brand strategy and digital marketing for fashion companies, persons, non-profits, and entertainment. Her firm creates and oversees online strategies for individuals, brands, and entertainment industry stakeholders. Current clients include IMG, LUNGevity, Furtuna Skin, Disney, as well as brands Nicole Miller and Express. Twice Social is based in Nashville, TN with operations in New York and Los Angeles.

Personal life
She has a dual residence in Nashville, Tennessee and New York, New York with her spouse Gary Gold, a longtime drummer and music producer for Smokey Robinson and Bonnie Raitt, and their two children. Emily formerly dated James Iha from The Smashing Pumpkins, Bruce Willis and Shawn LaBare.

References

External links
 
 
 

1981 births
American film actresses
American female models
Living people
21st-century American women